Myricitrin is a plant compound, the 3-O-α-L-rhamnopyranoside of myricetin.

Occurrences 
It can be isolated from the root bark of Myrica cerifera (Bayberry, a small tree native to North America), in Myrica esculenta, in Nymphaea lotus and N. odorata, in Chrysobalanus icaco and in Polygonum aviculare.

Myricitrin is used by several beetle species in their communication system. These include Plagioderma versicolora, Agelastica coerulea, Atrachya menetrisi, Altica nipponica, Altica oleracea, Gastrolina depressa.

Health effect 
Myricitrin is a nitric oxide and protein kinase C inhibitor and exhibits antipsychotic-like and anxiolytic-like effects in animal models of psychosis and anxiety respectively.

References 

Flavonol rhamnosides